Lough Carra is a limestone lake (marl) of , in County Mayo, Ireland, about  south of Castlebar. It drains into Lough Mask via the Keel River.

Lough Carra was part of the estate of the well-known Moore family of Moore Hall.

It is a well-known brown trout lough, and is situated northeast of Lough Mask.

Annalistic references

 AI688.1 Kl. Repose of Indlide, abbot of Cera, and of Diarmait, son of 'In Caech'. [AU —; AU 689].

Historical sites
Burriscarra Abbey
Castle Carra

See also
 List of Irish loughs

References

External links 
Moorehall and Lough Carra documentary 
Lough Carra website 
Article from Irish Fisheries
Article from Mayo on the Move
Video documentary filmed on Lough Carra

Carra